Juan Manuel Boselli Graf (born 9 November 1999) is a Uruguayan professional footballer who plays as a forward for Primeira Liga club Gil Vicente.

Club career

Defensor
Having previously represented Defensor at various youth levels, with whom he won the U17 Clausura title in 2016, Boselli received his first experience with the senior team on 2 February 2017 when he featured as an unused substitute in a 2–0 win over Rampla. He made his debut later that month, replacing goalscorer Gonzalo Bueno in the second half of a 2–1 victory against Juventud.

Loan to Peralada
In January 2019, he moved on loan to CF Peralada-Girona B, the reserve team of Girona FC.

Loan to Athletico Paranaense
On 13 August 2019, Club Athletico Paranaense confirmed that Boselli had joined the club on loan until December 2020. However, he left the club again less than a month later, even before making his debut. It was later revealed by the club's manager, Tiago Nunes, that Boselli "did not come to play in the first team" and that he "came to take the official photo with the black and red shirt but was immediately transferred to the U23 squad". He then began training with América Futebol Clube (MG) and even played a friendly game for the club, before joining the club on 5 September 2019 on loan for the rest of 2019 to guarantee more minutes on the court. However, he would return to Club Athletico Paranaense for the 2020 season, as the loan deal with the club was valid until December 2020. Boselli was registered for Paranaense's U-23 squad.

Loan to Cádiz B
In September 2020, Boselli began training with Cádiz CF B. The deal was announced on 5 October 2020, signing a loan-deal until 30 June 2022. The loan was terminated early after the 2021–22 season.

Loan to Tondela
On 30 August 2021, he joined Tondela in Portuguese Primeira Liga on loan until June 2023.

International career

Uruguay national youth teams
Boselli was called up to the Uruguay U20 side for the first time in March 2017, and made his debut as a substitute for Nicolás De La Cruz in a 1–0 friendly loss to Argentina. In May the same, he was named in Urruguay's squad for the 2017 FIFA U-20 World Cup in South Korea.

Career statistics

Honours
Uruguay U20
 South American Games silver medal: 2018

References

External links
Juan Manuel Boselli at AUF

1999 births
Living people
Footballers from Montevideo
Uruguayan footballers
Association football forwards
Uruguayan Primera División players
Segunda División B players
Primeira Liga players
Defensor Sporting players
CF Peralada players
Club Athletico Paranaense players
América Futebol Clube (MG) players
Cádiz CF B players
C.D. Tondela players
Gil Vicente F.C. players
Uruguay under-20 international footballers
South American Games silver medalists for Uruguay
South American Games medalists in football
Competitors at the 2018 South American Games
Uruguayan expatriate footballers
Uruguayan expatriate sportspeople in Spain
Uruguayan expatriate sportspeople in Brazil
Uruguayan expatriate sportspeople in Portugal
Expatriate footballers in Spain
Expatriate footballers in Brazil
Expatriate footballers in Portugal
Uruguayan sportspeople of Italian descent